Joseph Kanon (born 1946) is an American author, best known for thriller and spy novels set in the period immediately after World War II.

Early life 
In 1946, Kanon was born in Pennsylvania, U.S.

Education 
Kanon studied at Harvard University, and at Trinity College in Cambridge. As an undergraduate, he published his first stories in The Atlantic Monthly.

Career 
Kanon was the editor in chief, CEO, and president of the publishing houses Houghton Mifflin and E. P. Dutton in New York.

Kanon began his writing career in 1995. His first novel, Los Alamos (1997), became a bestseller and received the Edgar Award for Best First Novel in 1998. Further novels followed, including The Prodigal Spy, The Good German and Alibi.  His stories are set in the period between World War II and 1950, and he has often used a real event, such as the Potsdam Conference or the Manhattan Project, as the background for a murder case. His novels are critically acclaimed, and reviewers from the Boston Globe and The New York Times have compared his work with the novels of Graham Greene and John le Carré. A film based on The Good German was produced in 2006, directed by Steven Soderbergh and starring George Clooney and Cate Blanchett. Istanbul Passage is a spy thriller set in that city in 1945. Leaving Berlin (2015) concerns an American expatriate who becomes an unwilling double agent of the American and East German intelligence services during the Berlin Airlift of 1948-1949.

Personal life 
Kanon is married to Robin Straus, a literary agent. They reside in New York City, New York.

Works 
Los Alamos (1997)
The Prodigal Spy (1998)
The Good German (2001)
Alibi (2005)
Stardust (2009)
Istanbul Passage (2012)
Leaving Berlin (2014)
Defectors (2017)
The Accomplice (2019)
The Berlin Exchange (2022)

References

External links
Official website
MacMillan webpage
Interview with Joseph Kanon

1946 births
Living people
American book editors
American historical novelists
20th-century American novelists
American spy fiction writers
American thriller writers
Edgar Award winners
Harvard University alumni
Writers from New York City
Novelists from Pennsylvania
Writers of historical mysteries
21st-century American novelists
American male novelists
American publishing chief executives
20th-century American male writers
21st-century American male writers
Novelists from New York (state)